Shawn Camp is the self-titled debut album of American country music singer Shawn Camp. It was released in 1993 via Reprise Records.

Content
The album produced three singles: "Confessin' My Love", "Fallin' Never Felt So Good", and "Man, What a Woman". Mark Wright produced the album.

Dude Mowrey originally recorded "Fallin' Never Felt So Good" on his 1991 debut album Honky Tonk. Mark Chesnutt recorded both "Confessin' My Love" and "Fallin' Never Felt So Good" on his 2000 album Lost in the Feeling (also produced by Wright), in addition to releasing his version of the former as a single that year. Rhett Akins covered "K-I-S-S-I-N-G" on his 1996 album Somebody New.

Critical reception
Daniel Cooper of New Country magazine gave the album 2.5 out of 5 stars, praising Camp's singing and production but criticizing his lyrics, saying that "there's nary a memorable line anywhere on the record." Bobby Peacock of Roughstock was favorable when reviewing the album's 2010 release, praising Camp's lyrics while comparing the album's sound favorably to Marty Stuart and Dwight Yoakam.

Track listing

Personnel
Compiled from Shawn Camp liner notes.

Musicians
James Burton – electric guitar
Shawn Camp – vocals, acoustic guitar, Dobro, fiddle
Dan Dugmore – acoustic guitar
Pat Flynn – acoustic guitar
Paul Franklin – steel guitar
Owen Hale – drums
Roy Huskey, Jr. – upright bass
Kenny Malone – drums
Nashville String Machine – strings
Steve Nathan – keyboards
Alan O'Bryant – banjo
Brent Rowan – electric guitar
Jimmy Stewart – Dobro
Biff Watson – acoustic guitar
Willie Weeks – bass guitar

Background vocalists
Alison Krauss (on "K-I-S-S-I-N-G")
Jim Lauderdale (on "Fallin' Never Felt So Good")
Shelby Lynne (on "Confessin' My Love")
Alan O'Bryant (on "One of Them Days")
John Wesley Ryles
Dennis Wilson
Mark Wright
Curtis "Mr. Harmony" Young

Technical
Robert Charles – recording, overdubbing
Eric Flettrich – mixing
Carl Gorodetzky – concert master
John Hampton – mixing
Skid Mills – mixing
Warren Peterson – recording
Bergen White – string arrangement, conductor
Mark Wright – production

References

1993 debut albums
Shawn Camp (musician) albums
Reprise Records albums
Albums produced by Mark Wright (record producer)